is a train station located in Sakyō-ku, Kyoto, Kyoto Prefecture, Japan.

Lines
Eizan Electric Railway (Eiden)
Kurama Line

Adjacent stations

Railway stations in Kyoto Prefecture
Railway stations in Japan opened in 1929